The 2008 Acura Sports Car Challenge of St. Petersburg was the second round of the 2008 American Le Mans Series season.  It took place on the streets of St. Petersburg, Florida on April 5, 2008.

Race results
Class winners in bold.  Cars failing to complete 70% of winner's distance marked as Not Classified (NC).

Statistics
 Pole Position - #2 Audi Sport North America - 1:02.825
 Fastest Lap - #1 Audi Sport North America - 1:04.942

References

Stpetersburg
Grand Prix of St. Petersburg
2008 in sports in Florida
21st century in St. Petersburg, Florida